Kew is a suburb of Johannesburg, South Africa. It is located in Region E of the City of Johannesburg Metropolitan Municipality.

History
It became a suburb in 1905 and is named after Kew Gardens in London.

References

Johannesburg Region E